Sarah Edmiston (born 8 September 1975) is an Australian Paralympic athlete who specialises in the discus and shot put. At her first major international competition, she won the bronze medal in the Women's Discus F44 at the 2017 World Para Athletics Championships and followed this up with a silver medal in the same event at the 2019 World Para Athletics Championships. She also won the bronze medal in the Women's Discus F64 at the 2020 Summer Paralympics.

Personal
Edmiston was born on 8 September 1975 in Lower Hutt, New Zealand. In 2017, she moved to Perth, Western Australia. She is married to former Australian hurdler Paul Edmiston and they have four children.

Athletics
Edmiston started athletics with Bungaree Little Athletics Club. At the age of 19, a water skiing accident put a halt to her athletics career. She recommenced throwing again at the age of 25 but was only classified after the 2016 Rio Paralympics. She is classified as a F44. She is coached by her husband Paul Edmiston and is a member of the Perth Track and Field Club. At her first major international competition, she won the bronze medal in the Women's Discus F44 at the 2017 World Para Athletics Championships in London, England with a throw of 33.80m. In addition, she finished seventh in the Women's Shot Put F44 with a throw of 8.04m.

In 2016, Edmiston was awarded a Western Australian Institute of Sport athletics scholarship. At the 2019 World Para Athletics Championships in Dubai, she won the silver medal in the Women's Discus F44 with a throw of 36.43m.

Edmiston competed at the 2020 Summer Paralympics in Tokyo, winning the bronze medal in the Women's Discus F64 with an Oceania record throw of 37.85m.

At the 2022 Commonwealth Games, she won the silver medal in the Women's Discus F42-44/61-64.

References

External links
 
 
 Sarah Edmiston at Athletics Australia (archive)
 Sarah Edmiston at Australian Athletics Historical Results

1975 births
Athletes (track and field) at the 2020 Summer Paralympics
Living people
Medalists at the 2020 Summer Paralympics
Paralympic athletes of Australia
Paralympic bronze medalists for Australia
Athletes from Lower Hutt
Australian female discus throwers
Australian female shot putters
20th-century Australian women
21st-century Australian women
Commonwealth Games silver medallists for Australia
Commonwealth Games medallists in athletics
Athletes (track and field) at the 2022 Commonwealth Games
Medallists at the 2022 Commonwealth Games